The Zmaj Fizir FN was a plane designed for primary (initial) training of pilots in Yugoslavia before World War II. It was constructed in Zmaj, a Zemun-based factory, in the Rogožarski factory in Belgrade, and Albatros in Sremska Mitrovica.

Fizir FN had an exceptional low-speed stability, a desirable trait for a training aircraft, and was reliable and easy to maintain. It was also widely used as a sport aircraft.

Design and development

The first prototype of Fizir FN (Fizir trainer) aircraft was designed and manufactured in Rudolf Fizir Workshop in Petrovaradin in 1929. Rudolf Fizir's workshop did not have the capacity for industrial production of aircraft, their area of work was design and prototyping. Although being small, this workshop played a significant role in the development of Yugoslav aeronautics after it emerged and was used for the training of engineers who later became important and famous in our aeronautical engineering. Many successful airplane prototypes from this workshop were later produced in Yugoslav airplane factories.

Fizir FN was a single-engine two-seat biplane trainer with a pair of struts on each side. The wings were rounded at the tips and the flaps were located on both the lower and upper wings. The landing gear was fixed to the hinge axis. For amortization either coil springs and rubber (old type) or the rings of sand (later types) were used. The wooden structure of the fuselage and the wings were covered with a canvas. While the aircraft was in production, it underwent several refinements, aircraft was continually being refined, so that there are several sub-types of these aircraft, depending on engines installed.

Operational history

The first three aircraft was produced by the Zmaj aircraft factory for the Aero Club. Given  excellent flight characteristics, the Air Force Command decided to use it to replace all training aircraft that had been in use for basic training previously. At that time basic pilot training schools used the Ikarus SB-1 (Mali Brandenburg) with a  Mercedes engine, Zmaj built Hanriot H-320 with  Salmson engines manufactured in 1928. In the beginning of 1931, Zmaj produced and delivered first 20 serial Fizir FN aircraft with the Walter NZ 120 radial engine and 10 with the  Mercedes D.II inline engine. By 1939, Zmaj produced 137 aircraft, Rogožarski fabricated 40 aircraft and in the 1940 the Sremska Mitrovica-based Albatros factory produced additional  20 aircraft of this type. Before the war, the Navy Aviation ordered four hydro Fizir FN (Floatplane) with floats and with a more powerful  Walter Mars I engine. The production of last 10 Fizir FN aircraft started in 1943 in Zmaj for the Croatian Air Force, but were not finished until the liberation, when they were handed over to the Aeronautical Federation of Yugoslavia.

During World War II, Yugoslav-manufactured aircraft were used by Italy in Albania, and by the Independent State of Croatia. Aircraft Fizir FN was reliable, easy to fly and maintain, so this plane stayed operative for many years (almost till 1950), as basic pilot training aircraft, both in military and civilian aviation, including sports flying.

There are two surviving Fizir FN aircraft. One (serial number 9009, registration YU-CAY) is kept in the Museum of Yugoslav aviation at Belgrade Nikola Tesla airport. The other, designated Fizir FNH, which is a Fizir FN converted to a floatplane (serial number 9002, registration YU-CGO), is kept in Technical Museum, Zagreb.

Operators

Royal Yugoslav Air Force 206 aircraft

SFR Yugoslav Air Force – Postwar.
Letalski center Maribor (Civil operator) –  Postwar

Air Force of the Independent State of Croatia 23 ex-Royal Yugoslav Air Force

Regia Aeronautica

Variants
Fizir FN – Mercedes – with the engine Mercedes 88 kW,
 Fizir FN – Walter – with the engine Walter NZ-120 88 kW and
 Fizir FN – Walter Mars I – seaplane with the engine Walter Mars I 106 kW, (seaplane nicknamed "Little Fizir" or "Fizir Mars").

Specifications

See also

Notes

References

Зачетници авијације, ИРО "Вук Караџић" и "Службени лист СФРЈ", Београд, 1988.
Д. Лучић: Основи практичне аеродинамике са описима аероплана, Библиотека "Ваздухопловног Гласника", Нови Сад, 1936,
О. Петровић., Војни аероплани Краљевине СХС/Југославије (Део II: 1931–1941.), Лет 3/2004. Београд, 2004.
3. Ж. Вељовић., Пет деценија Змаја, ИПМ Змај Земун, 1972.
В. Илић., Школе војног ваздухопловства Краљевине СХС/Југославије, Лет 3/2004. Београд, 2004.
Војна Енциклопедија, Београд, 1971.
С. Микић; Историја југословенског ваздухопловства, Шт. Д. Грегорић, Београд,1933.
Ш. Оштрић и М. Мицевски.; Летећи Чунови: Чамци који лете – летилице које плове, Изложба фотографија, Галерија '73, Београд, 14–27. септембра 2007. год.
В. Микић; Зракопловство НДХ 1941–1945, ВИИВЈ, Београд, 2000.
Јанић, Чедомир; Петровић, Огњан; (2010.). Век авијације у Србији 1910–2010, 225 значајних летелица (на ((sr))). Београд: Аерокомуникације. .

External links

https://web.archive.org/web/20120219070818/http://www.goldenyears.ukf.net/
http://www.airwar.ru/enc/other/fizirfn.html (ru)
http://www.muzejrv.mod.gov.rs/pages_files/parter_files/partexpo/fn_files/fn.html 
http://www.muzejvazduhoplovstva.org.rs/eksponati.php?jez=sr&id=3

Zmaj aircraft
Rogožarski aircraft
1930s Yugoslav military aircraft
Trainer aircraft
Biplanes
Single-engined tractor aircraft
Glider tugs
Aircraft first flown in 1929